The 2013 Finn Gold Cup, and the official Finn World Championships, was held on Tallinn Bay, Estonia, between 23 and 31 August 2013. The hosting yacht club was Kalev Yacht Club located in Pirita.

Medalists

Final results

References

External links 
 Finn Gold Cup 2013
 Full Results
 Kalev Yacht Club
 The Finn Channel, youtube.com
 Live broadcasting and Livetracking

Finn Gold Cup
Finn Gold Cup
Sports competitions in Tallinn
2013 in Estonian sport
International sports competitions hosted by Estonia
August 2013 sports events in Europe
21st century in Tallinn
Sailing competitions in Estonia